Dermot McCabe (born 17 May 1976) is a former Gaelic footballer who played for the Cavan county team.

Playing career
He broke into the Cavan team in 1995 when they lost an Ulster final against Tyrone. He helped Cavan reach the All-Ireland Under 21 Football Championship final in 1996, but they were defeated by Kerry. In 1997, McCabe was highly influential as Cavan claimed the Ulster Senior Football Championship, beating Derry in Clones.

Widely regarded as one of Cavan's best players of modern times, McCabe claimed an All-Star Award for his efforts in 1997. He played for Ireland in the revived 1998 International Rules Series against Australia. He was one of Ireland's stars by scoring 14 points. He was again selected for Ireland when they won the 2001 International Rules Series.

In 2011 McCabe was part of the Cavan minor team management when they won the Ulster Minor Football Championship.

Honours
Cavan
 Ulster Senior Football Championship (1): 1997
 Ulster Under-21 Football Championship (1): 1996

Gowna
 Cavan Senior Football Championship (6): 1994, 1996, 1997, 1999, 2000, 2002

Individual
 All Star Award (1): 1997

References

External links
 1997 Ulster Final

1976 births
Living people
Cavan inter-county Gaelic footballers
Gowna Gaelic footballers